Giuseppe Grassi may refer to:

Giuseppe Grassi (politician) (1883–1950), Italian politician
Giuseppe Grassi (cyclist) (born 1942), Italian cyclist